The South Branch of the Mad River is a  mountain brook on the Maine-New Hampshire border in the United States, within the eastern White Mountains. It is a tributary of the Mad River, a short feeder of the Cold River, part of the Saco River watershed.

The South Branch, beginning in New Hampshire and finishing in Maine, flows east off the slopes of West Royce Mountain. It joins the Mad River less than 0.l mile above that river's end at the Cold River in the floor of Evans Notch.

See also

List of rivers of Maine
List of rivers of New Hampshire

References

Rivers of Maine
Rivers of New Hampshire
Saco River
Rivers of Knox County, Maine